In control theory, the discrete Lyapunov equation (also known as Stein equation) is of the form

The continuous Lyapunov equation is of the form
.

The Lyapunov equation occurs in many branches of control theory, such as stability analysis and optimal control. This and related equations are named after the Russian mathematician Aleksandr Lyapunov.

Application to stability
The notation  means that the matrix  is positive definite.

Theorem (continuous time version).  Given any , there exists a unique  satisfying  if and only if the linear system  is globally asymptotically stable.  The quadratic function  is a Lyapunov function that can be used to verify stability.

Theorem (discrete time version).  Given any , there exists a unique  satisfying  if and only if the linear system  is globally asymptotically stable.  As before,  is a Lyapunov function.

Computational aspects of solution

The Lyapunov equation is linear, and so if  contains  entries can be solved in  time using standard matrix factorization methods.

However, specialized algorithms are available which can yield solutions much quicker owing to the specific structure of the Lyapunov equation. For the discrete case, the Schur method of Kitagawa is often used.  For the continuous Lyapunov equation the Bartels–Stewart algorithm can be used.

Analytic solution
Furthermore, if the matrix  is stable, the solution can also be expressed as an integral (continuous time case) or as an infinite sum (discrete time case).

Discrete time
Using the result that , one has

To get , one must just reshape  appropriately.

Moreover, if  is stable, the solution  can also be written as
.

.

Continuous time
Using again the Kronecker product notation and the vectorization operator, one has the matrix equation

Similar to the discrete-time case, if  is stable, the solution  can also be written as
.

.

Relationship Between Discrete and Continuous Lyapunov Equations 

We start with the continuous-time linear dynamics:

.

And then discretize it as follows:

Where  indicates a small forward displacement in time.

Where we've defined . Now we can use the discrete time Lyapunov equation for :

Expanding this expression out yields:

Recall that  is a small displacement in time. Letting  go to zero brings us closer and closer to having continuous dynamics—and in the limit we achieve them. It stands to reason that we should also recover the continuous-time Lyapunov equations in the limit as well.

which is the continuous-time Lyapunov equation, as desired.

See also
 Sylvester equation
 Algebraic Riccati equation
 Kalman filter

References

Control theory